Plocamopherus indicus is a species of sea slug, a nudibranch, a shell-less marine gastropod mollusk in the family Polyceridae.

Distribution 
This species was described from Ambon Island, Indonesia.

References

Bergh, L.S.R. 1890. Die Nudibranchien des ‘‘Sunda-Meeres’’. Malacologische Untersuchungen. In: Reisen im Archipel der Philippinen von Dr. Carl Gottfried Semper. Zweiter Theil. Wissenschaftliche Resultate. Band 2, Theil 3, Heft 17, pp. 873–992, pls. 885–889.

Polyceridae
Gastropods described in 1890